The 1928 NFL season was the ninth regular season of the National Football League. The league dropped to 10 teams as the Cleveland Bulldogs and the Duluth Eskimos both folded before the season, while the Rochester Jeffersons, after missing two seasons of play, also folded, and the Buffalo Bisons also had a year out from the league. The Detroit Wolverines were added as an expansion team. 

The Providence Steam Roller were named the NFL champions after finishing the season with the best record.

Teams
The league dropped to ten teams in 1928.

Championship race
After four weeks, the Chicago Bears and the Detroit Wolverines were both unbeaten.  On October 21, the Packers beat the Bears, 16–6, leaving Detroit, at 2–0–0, at the top of the standings.  On November 3, near Philadelphia, the Frankford Yellow Jackets (4–1–0) hosted Detroit (3–0–0), and beat them 25–7.  The next day, Detroit (3–1–0) lost 7–0 at Providence (4–1–0), and the Yellow Jackets and the Steamrollers were tied for the lead at the end of Week Seven.

Frankford played a series against Pottsville in Week Eight, winning 19–0 at home, and 24–0 on the road, for a 7–1–1 record that put it in first place ahead of Providence.  In Week Nine, on November 18, the Providence Steam Roller (5–1–1) hosted the Frankford Yellow Jackets (7–1–2) in Rhode Island, in a regular season game that ultimately would determine which team would win the NFL championship.  Providence's 6–0 win put the Steam Roller in first place, and it didn't lose any of its last three games, finishing at 8–1–2, while Frankford finished second at 11–3–2.  Had the Yellow Jackets beaten the Steamrollers, their records at season's end would have been 12–2–2 and 7–2–2, respectively.  Providence was formally awarded the championship at the post-season meeting of the NFL owners.

Standings

References

 NFL Record and Fact Book
 NFL History 1921–1930 (Last accessed December 4, 2005)
 Total Football: The Official Encyclopedia of the National Football League

1928